Calliostoma antipodense is a species of sea snail, a marine gastropod mollusk in the family Calliostomatidae.

Some authors place this taxon in the subgenus Calliostoma (Maurea)

Description
The height of the shell attains 37 mm. The glossy, orange buff shell has a conical shape and is slightly higher than broad.

Distribution
This marine species occurs off Antipodes Island.

References

 Bruce A. Marshall,  A Revision of the Recent Calliostoma Species of New Zealand (Mollusca: Gastropoda; Trochoidea); The Nautilus v. 108 (1994–1995)

External links
 

antipodense
Gastropods described in 1995